Lorenzo Murdock (born 2 February 1961) is a Jamaican former cyclist. He competed in the individual road race event at the 1984 Summer Olympics.

References

External links
 

1961 births
Living people
Jamaican male cyclists
Olympic cyclists of Jamaica
Cyclists at the 1984 Summer Olympics
Place of birth missing (living people)